Jung Chi-in (born 21 August 1997) is a South Korean football forward, who plays for Daegu FC in the K League 1.

Club career
Born on 21 August 1997, Jung made his debut as a substitute for Daegu FC on 5 May 2018, playing against Gyeongnam FC in the K League 1.

Club career statistics

References

External links 
 

1997 births
Living people
Association football forwards
South Korean footballers
Daegu FC players
K League 1 players